Limena is a comune (municipality) in the Province of Padua in the Italian region Veneto, located about  west of Venice and about  north of Padua.  

Limena borders the following municipalities: Curtarolo, Padua, Piazzola sul Brenta, Vigodarzere, Villafranca Padovana.

References

Cities and towns in Veneto